Puppet Master 5: The Final Chapter (also known as simply Puppet Master 5) is a 1994 direct-to-video horror film written by Charles Band among others, and directed by Jeff Burr. It is the fifth film in the Puppet Master franchise, the sequel to 1993's Puppet Master 4, and stars Gordon Currie as the series' third Puppet Master, and Ian Ogilvy, his colleague, whose attempts to salvage the animated puppets of André Toulon (Guy Rolfe) from the Bodega Bay Inn are foiled by a demon.

As in the previous film, the puppets serve as protagonists, rather than terrorize as they had in the first and second films. As the subtitle indicates, Puppet Master 5 was intended to be the final installment. However, in 1998, a sixth, Curse of the Puppet Master, was released, and the series has been ongoing since.

Plot
Following the events of the previous film, Rick Myers has been arrested under the suspicion of having caused the murders of Dr. Piper and Baker, but Dr. Jennings, the new director of the Artificial Intelligence research project and Rick's temporary superior, gets him out on bail. Blade has been confiscated, but he escapes from the police department's evidence room and jumps into Susie's purse as she comes to fetch Rick. Lauren lies comatose in the hospital following the events in the inn. Meanwhile, in the underworld, Sutekh decides to take matters into his own hands and infuses his life essence into his own Totem figure.

While Jennings professes scepticism toward Rick's story, he becomes actually quite interested in acquiring Toulon's secret, especially since the project's unofficial sponsors are luring with a sizeable contribution, should he succeed in presenting a prototype soon. Jennings returns to the Bodega Bay Inn with three hired thugs - Tom Hendy, Jason, and Scott - to collect the puppets and the formula, but in the meantime Rick is roused by a nightmare and finds Blade by his side. Sensing that something is about to happen, Rick and Blade depart for the hotel. Susie, while paying a visit to Lauren, witnesses her friend receiving a vision of Sutekh and his Totem. Unable to contact Rick, she proceeds to the hotel as well.

While searching the building, Jason and Hendy are ambushed and killed by Sutekh, and Scott encounters and is knocked out by Pinhead and Jester. Jennings also encounters Sutekh but is saved by Torch and Six-Shooter; and the puppets start fighting back against Sutekh. Rick goes back to his room and runs into Suzie, but they both get locked in by Sutekh's powers. Through his computer, Rick gets in contact with Lauren, who tells him to activate The Decapitron. Jennings enters the room and tries to convince Rick to collect the puppets and leave the hotel. In the meantime, Scott recovers, but is also found and slain by Sutekh.

Jester enters the room and leads Rick to where the Decapitron is hidden. Rick, Suzie and Jennings proceed to revive Decapitron, and Toulon advises them to leave the hotel while the puppets will engage Sutekh. Jennings, however, insists on taking one of the puppets with him, despite Rick and Suzie's warnings. Rick, Suzie, and Jennings take the elevator down, but then Jennings attacks and knocks out Rick, while Suzie is pushed out of the cabin. But when Jennings exits the elevator, he is stopped by Decapitron and the other puppets, who force him back to the elevator shaft. With the cabin already gone and the door secretly opened by Pinhead, Jennings falls to his death.

Sutekh corners Rick and Suzie, but Decapitron shows up, allowing them to escape. The puppets engage Sutekh, who fights back; but having stayed too long in the mortal world, the demon's essence has become vulnerable, and his power wanes. In desperation, Sutekh attempts to escape back into the underworld by opening a portal, but Decapitron fires electron bolts at it, overloading the conduit and causing it to explode, destroying Sutekh.

Rick takes the puppets back home to repair and care for them. Toulon speaks with Rick one final time, again entrusting his puppets and their secret to him while they will continue to act as his protectors.

Cast
 Guy Rolfe as André Toulon
 Gordon Currie as Rick Myers
 Chandra West as Susie
 Ian Ogilvy as Jennings
 Teresa Hill as Lauren
 Nicholas Guest as Tom Hendy
 Willard Pugh as Jason
 Diane McBain as Attorney
 Duane Whitaker as Scott
 Kaz Garas as Man #2 
 Clu Gulager as Man #1
 Ron O'Neal as Detective
 Jason Adams (archive footage) as Cameron Phillips
 Jake McKinnon (uncredited) as Sutekh

Featured puppets
 Blade
 Pinhead
 Jester
 Tunneler
 Torch
 Six Shooter
 Decapitron
 Dark Totem

DVD releases 
The Final Chapter, as well as the second, third and fourth installments of the series, are available in DVD format through a Full Moon Features box set that has since been discontinued. But in 2007, Full Moon reacquired the rights to the first five films, and the set has since been re-released. However, more recently the first six films of the franchise have been available as part of the budget-priced Midnight Horror Collection released by Echo Bridge Entertainment; parts 1, 2 and 3 on one double-sided DVD, and parts 4, 5 and 6 on a separately sold double-sided disc.

Timeline issue
 In Puppet Master 4, it confirms André Toulon's time of death as March 15, somewhere between 1943 and 1945. However, in this film, Rick Meyers tells Dr. Jennings that André Toulon died shortly AFTER World War II ended, which was April 1945. If Toulon's day and month of death remains the same, André Toulon killing himself on March 15, 1946 would NOT be shortly after WWII ended. However, since this is the only contradiction, it's best speculated that Rick Meyers just misspoke, and possibly meant March 15, 1945 shortly BEFORE World War II ended. More on this in Retro and Axis of Evil.

Soundtrack
The fact of having no soundtrack of this movie, is because some used songs are from the previous film, Meridian and Robot Wars.

External links
 
 

1994 films
1994 horror films
Films directed by Jeff Burr
American supernatural horror films
Puppet films
Puppet Master (film series)
American sequel films
Films scored by Richard Band
1990s English-language films
1990s American films